Kaija-Liisa Keskivitikka (born 11 November 1945) is a Finnish speed skater. She competed at the 1964 Winter Olympics and the 1968 Winter Olympics.

References

External links
 

1945 births
Living people
Finnish female speed skaters
Olympic speed skaters of Finland
Speed skaters at the 1964 Winter Olympics
Speed skaters at the 1968 Winter Olympics
People from Rovaniemi
Sportspeople from Lapland (Finland)